Alexander Graham (April 6, 1816 – May 1, 1895) was an American politician and businessman.

Born in Utica, New York, Graham was educated in Homer, New York. Graham was in the banking and real estate business. He served as superintendent of schools in Chemung County, New York and then in Tompkins County, New York. In 1851, he served in the New York State Assembly, as a Whig, from Tompkins County, New York. In 1858, he settled in Janesville, Wisconsin. He served as school commissioner in Janesville and served on the Janesville Common Council in 1864. In 1869, 1871, and 1872, Graham served in the Wisconsin State Assembly as a Republican.

References 

1816 births
1895 deaths
Politicians from Utica, New York
Politicians from Janesville, Wisconsin
Businesspeople from Wisconsin
New York (state) Whigs
19th-century American politicians
Wisconsin city council members
Members of the New York State Assembly
Businesspeople from Utica, New York
19th-century American businesspeople
Republican Party members of the Wisconsin State Assembly